A regality was a territorial jurisdiction in old Scots law which might be created by the King or Queen only, by granting lands to a subject in liberam regalitatem, and the tract of land over which such a right extended.

A lord of regality had a civil jurisdiction equal to that of the monarch's sheriff, and more extensive criminal jurisdiction, equivalent to that of the High Court of Justiciary (except for treason). A regality was a superior jurisdiction to a barony and might be exercised over baronies within the regality. The jurisdiction was exercised by the regality court, usually presided over by the bailie or his deputy, and composed of the suitors of court, who held lands by suit of court.

Initially regalities were a part of the system of government, delegated jurisdiction, but from the 14th century, the lords of regality frequently sought to usurp royal authority and establish semi-independent domains. In the 15th century, regalities again became a means of governing by delegated authority. Regalities and regality jurisdictions were abolished by the Heritable Jurisdictions (Scotland) Act 1746.

See also
 Burgh of regality

Sources
 The Oxford Companion to Law, David M. Walker, 1980

Government of Scotland
Legal history of Scotland
Feudalism in Scotland
Scots property law
History of agriculture in Scotland